Peshawar Cantonment is a garrison located in Peshawar, Khyber Pakhtunkhwa, Pakistan. Although the cantonment is located within Peshawar City District, it is an independent municipality under control of the Military Lands & Cantonments Department of the Ministry of Defence.

Popular areas in the Cantonment are Garrison Rangers Club, PAF Hospital and others. Peshawar Cantonment is under the rule of the Pakistan Army.

References

Peshawar
Cantonments of Pakistan
Pakistan Navy bases